Rossola is an alternative name for several wine grape varieties including:

Rossola nera
Rossignola
Roter Veltliner
Trebbiano